Ferdinand Rabeder (31 May 1931 – 19 November 2005) was an Austrian rower. He competed at the 1956 Summer Olympics in Melbourne with the men's single sculls where he was eliminated in the round one repechage.

References

1931 births
2005 deaths
Austrian male rowers
Olympic rowers of Austria
Rowers at the 1956 Summer Olympics